Verity Harte is a British philosopher and George A. Saden Professor of Philosophy and Classics at Yale University.

Books
 Plato on Parts and Wholes: the Metaphysics of Structure, Oxford: Clarendon 2002
 Aristotle and the Stoics Reading Plato, co-edited by Harte, M.M. McCabe, R.W. Sharples, A. Sheppard, London: Institute of Classical Studies 2011
 Politeia in Greek and Roman Philosophy, co-edited by Harte and Melissa Lane, Cambridge: CUP 2013
 Rereading Ancient Philosophy: Old Chestnuts and Sacred Cows, co-edited by Harte and Raphael Woolf, Cambridge University Press 2018

References

External links
Profile at Yale University

1949 births
Living people
21st-century British philosophers
Philosophy academics
British women philosophers
Alumni of the University of Cambridge
Yale University faculty
Academics of King's College London
Scholars of ancient philosophy